Robert L Jacks (1927-1987) was an American film producer.

He married the daughter of Darryl F. Zanuck who gave him a job at 20th Century Fox.

He set up his own company in the late 1960s.

Select filmography
Lure of the Wilderness (1952)
Princess of the Nile (1954)
The Proud Ones (1956)

References

External links
Robert L Jacks at IMDb
Robert L Jacks at BFI
Image of Robert L. Jacks, Michael Learned, Richard Thomas and Lee Rich with their Emmys for "The Waltons," Los Angeles, California, 1973. Los Angeles Times Photographic Archive (Collection 1429). UCLA Library Special Collections, Charles E. Young Research Library, University of California, Los Angeles.

American film producers
1927 births
1987 deaths